The 2013 Greenlandic local elections were held on 2 April 2013.

References

Greenland
Local elections in Greenland
Greenland
2013 in Greenland